Elke Clijsters (born 18 January 1985) is a former professional tennis player from Belgium.

The daughter of Belgian football player Lei Clijsters (1956–2009) and sister of former world No. 1, Kim Clijsters (born 1983), won 2002 the girls' Wimbledon Championships doubles title with Barbora Strýcová, and the girls' US Open doubles title with compatriot Kirsten Flipkens. Her highest singles ranking was 389, a ranking she achieved on 15 September 2003. She played in the Belgium Fed Cup team in 2002, 2003 and 2004, losing all four matches, of which one was a singles match. In 2004, she reached the finals of two ITF singles tournaments, winning the one in Bournemouth. In the same year, she also reached the finals of two ITF doubles tournaments, of which she also won one. She retired in 2004 due to a persistent back injury.

Elke married footballer Jelle Van Damme on 31 May 2008 in Bree. They had their first child in 2009, a boy. She gave birth to their second baby, a girl in November 2010. The marriage ended in 2016. In 2021, Clijsters participated in the Belgian version of The Bachelorette.

ITF Circuit finals

Singles: 4 (1–3)

Doubles: 10 (7–3)

References

External links
 
 
 

1985 births
Living people
People from Bilzen
Belgian female tennis players
Sportspeople from Limburg (Belgium)
Wimbledon junior champions
US Open (tennis) junior champions
Grand Slam (tennis) champions in girls' doubles